Happy Hour: The South River Road Sessions is an EP by Uncle Kracker. It was released on June 22, 2010 under Atlantic Records. The EP features country versions of select tracks from Kracker's Happy Hour album released 2009, and "Letter to My Daughters" from his second album No Stranger to Shame. South River Road is an actual road in Harrison Twp. MI where he grew up and attended high school. It has a review rating of 2.5.

Track listing

Personnel
Alex Al- bass guitar
Herschel Boone- background vocals
Mike Bradford- bass guitar, electric guitar, keyboards, string arrangements
Dennis Caplinger- banjo, fiddle
Chris Chaney- bass guitar
Dan Chase- programming
Sheryl Crow- background vocals on "Smile"
Dorian Crozier- drums, percussion, programming
George Doering- electric guitar
Paul Franklin- pedal steel guitar
Tommy Harden- drums
James House- acoustic guitar
Sean Hurley- bass guitar
Kid Rock- programming and vocals on "Good To Be Me"
Jesse Lee- vocals on "Me Again"
Doug McKean- programming
Jamie Muhoberac- keyboards
Larry Paxton- upright bass
Tim Pierce- electric guitar
Gary Prim- piano
Rae Rae- background vocals
Marty Rifkin- dobro, pedal steel guitar
Steve Stetson- drums
Ty Stone- background vocals
Russell Terrell- background vocals
Neal Tiermann- acoustic guitar
James Trombly- Hammond organ, piano
Uncle Kracker- lead vocals
Wanda Vick- dobro, fiddle, mandolin
Marlon Young- bass guitar, acoustic guitar

Chart performance

References

2010 EPs
Uncle Kracker EPs
Atlantic Records EPs
Albums produced by Michael Bradford
Albums produced by Rob Cavallo
Country albums by American artists